4-Nitrobenzoic acid is an organic compound with the formula C6H4(NO2)CO2H. It is a pale yellow solid. It is a precursor to 4-nitrobenzoyl chloride, the precursor to the anesthetic procaine and folic acid. It is also a precursor to 4-aminobenzoic acid.

Production
4-Nitrobenzoic acid is prepared by oxidation of 4-nitrotoluene using oxygen or dichromate as oxidants.

Alternatively, it has been prepared by nitration of polystyrene followed by oxidation of the alkyl substituent.  This method proceeds with improved para/ortho selectivity owing to the steric protection of the ortho positions by the polymer backbone.

Safety 
This compound has a rat  of 1960 mg/kg.

References 

Benzoic acids
Nitrobenzenes